The Tenth Government of the Republic of Croatia was the second of two Croatian Government cabinets led by Prime Minister Ivo Sanader. It was announced on 12 January 2008 and its term ended on 6 July 2009, when Jadranka Kosor formed the 11th cabinet following Sanader's surprise resignation. Cabinet members represented parties of the ruling coalition which was formed following the 2007 parliamentary elections:

Croatian Democratic Union (HDZ)
Croatian Social Liberal Party (HSLS)
Independent Democratic Serb Party (SDSS)
Croatian Peasant Party (HSS)

It was the first Croatian cabinet since the first multi-party elections in 1990 to have a party representing the Serb minority in Croatia (SDSS) as its member, with Slobodan Uzelac holding office as of one of the Deputy Prime Ministers. This was mainly due to the fact that this cabinet was heavily dependent on the support of the 8 national minority representatives in the Croatian Parliament, so as to be able to command a parliamentary majority.

Motions of confidence

Party breakdown 
Party breakdown of cabinet ministers (6 July 2009):

Changes from the Cabinet of Ivo Sanader I
In order to accommodate coalition partners, the number of Deputy Prime ministers grew to four from two in the previous cabinet (with two posts held by HDZ members Kosor and Polančec and the additional two by Adlešič of HSLS and Uzelac of SDSS). 
The Ministry of Agriculture, Forest and Water Management was split into the Ministry of Regional Development, Forestry and Water Management was established (headed by Petar Čobanković (HDZ) who also headed the old ministry), and Ministry of Agriculture, Fisheries and Rural Development (which was taken over by Božidar Pankretić of HSS). The latter ministry was formed mainly to accommodate HSS demands which ran on a platform seeking to stimulate re-development of rural areas.
After five years, Ministry of Tourism was separated from what was earlier Ministry of the Sea, Tourism, Transport and Development and Damir Bajs (HSS) was appointed new Minister of Tourism. The Ministry of Tourism had earlier existed from 1990 to 1992 under PMs Mesić, Manolić and Gregurić and from 1993 to 2003 under Valentić, Mateša and Račan.

List of ministers and portfolios
Some periods in the table below start before 12 January 2008 because the minister also served in the Cabinet of Ivo Sanader I (23 December 2003 – 12 January 2008) and extend beyond 6 July 2009 in case of ministers who continued to hold posts in the following Cabinet of Jadranka Kosor. The cabinet had four Deputy Prime Ministers: for Đurđa Adlešič and Slobodan Uzelac these were their only posts in the cabinet, while Jadranka Kosor and Damir Polančec served as both Deputy Prime Ministers and ministers of their respective portfolios.

Changes

References

External links
Official website of the Croatian Government
Chronology of Croatian cabinets at Hidra.hr 

Sanader, 2
2008 establishments in Croatia
2009 disestablishments in Croatia
Cabinets established in 2008
Cabinets disestablished in 2009